Tranmere Rovers F.C. played the 1923–24 season in the Football League Third Division North. It was their third season of league football, and they finished 12th of 22. They reached the Sixth Qualifying Round of the FA Cup.

Football League

References 

Tranmere Rovers F.C. seasons